Rowetta Idah (born 5 January 1966, in Manchester), also known as Rowetta or Rowetta Satchell, is a British singer. She is best known for her work with the Happy Mondays, recording and touring with the band from 1990 and recently reforming with the original lineup. Her 1989 track "Reach Out" has been sampled by Steve Angello, Laidback Luke and Todd Terry. She was also the last woman standing, finishing fourth, in the first series of The X Factor in 2004.

Early years
Rowetta was born to an English mother of Jewish origin and a Nigerian father, politician George Idah, who left the family when she was three. She realised her singing ability after winning a talent competition at the age of twelve. She attended Bury Grammar School, and after completing her secondary education worked as a professional singer. In 1987, Rowetta released two singles with the Vanilla Sound Corps. She also lent her voice to Inner City songs. During this time, she released two songs: "Back Where We Belong" and "Passion". In 1988 she collaborated with Dynasty of 2 on the single "Stop This Thing". She worked as a backing singer on numerous albums including Simply Red's 1991 album Stars. Rowetta is the voice on the renowned 1989 track "Reach Out" with Sweet Mercy. The track has been sampled by many, including Laidback Luke, Slam, Steve Angello and Todd Terry, and was remixed and re-released in 2008.

Career

Happy Mondays
In 1990 Rowetta joined the Happy Mondays. She featured on their single "Step On" which charted at number 5. This was followed by two albums, Pills 'n' Thrills and Bellyaches and Yes Please!, and three world tours. The group split and reformed a few times, but decided to split for good in 2000.

After the break-up of The Happy Mondays, she did not return to the music business immediately, although she did play herself in the Michael Winterbottom film 24 Hour Party People, which depicted the band's most successful years.

Rowetta rejoined the Happy Mondays in 2012 with the full original lineup. A tour followed and a new album and world tour were planned for 2013.

The X Factor
Rowetta re-entered the spotlight in 2004 when she auditioned for a place in the finals of The X Factor. After impressing the judges with her rendition of Lady Marmalade, she was placed in the over-25 category, which was mentored by Simon Cowell, who described her as "Amazing, but barking bloody mad".

Her soulful, powerful voice proved to be a hit with audiences, although she was criticised for competing as an established singer against amateurs. The producers defended her, stating that the show was open to anybody. Her performances on the show earned her rave reviews and she made the quarter-final and was the last woman in the competition, never having to compete in a sing-off.

Post X Factor
In 2005, Rowetta released an album on Gut Records.
In November 2005 and 2006, She appeared on the BBC's Children in Need appeal, singing live with the BBC Orchestra in 2005, and on Celebrity Scissorhands in 2006. She provided vocals for the Cornershop single "Wop The Groove" in 2006.

In 2006, Rowetta had a cameo as herself in Footballer's Wives:Extra Time.
A year later, she made her musical theatre debut at the Palace Theatre, Manchester in The Best of Broadway, alongside Suranne Jones, and appeared at the IndigO2 with Marti Webb, Stephen Gately and Maria Friedman in Christmas on Broadway. Rowetta also spent August 2007 presenting the show The Terry & Ro Show on Gaydio with Terry Longden, and also became the station imaging on community station Salford City Radio. In addition, she toured Japan, where she has a huge fanbase. She also appeared on a Reality TV Special of The Weakest Link where she was voted off by the audience in the seventh round.

According to a 2008 BBC 6 Music interview with Peter Hook, Rowetta recorded vocals for a track on the debut album by his new band Freebass. A new version of "Reach Out" featuring Rowetta and mixed by Mobin Master spent Christmas 2008 and the first part of 2009 at number 1 in the Beatport Charts.

Rowetta also presents her own radio show on Saturdays at 4 pm on Gaydio 88.4FM and co-presents the Manchester United fanzine show Red Wednesday on BBC Radio Manchester. She starred in a nationwide tour of 'The Songs of Sister Act' with Sheila Ferguson. A new version of “Reach Out” featuring Rowetta and mixed by Mobin Master spent Christmas 2008 and the first part of 2009 at number 1 in the Beatport Charts. Rowetta toured the UK with the London Community Gospel Choir in a new version of 'The Songs of Sister Act'. In 2010, Rowetta appeared with Peter Hook and the Light, for many dates of Hook's Unknown Pleasures tour and has collaborated with Tom Stephan (Superchumbo) and J Nitti on new dance tracks. In 2010, Rowetta appeared in the Pop Goes the '80s UK theatre tour. In 2011, Rowetta recorded with Peter Hook and the Light, Mirror People and the Kino Club.  In 2014, Rowetta appeared on stage at Party in the Park's Poole. On 18 May 2015, she performed with the Light for their 35th anniversary of the death of Joy Division frontman Ian Curtis.

In 2015, Rowetta toured again with the Happy Mondays for their 25-year anniversary of the album Pills 'n' Thrills and Bellyaches.

Personal life
During her time on The X Factor, it was revealed that Rowetta had been a victim of domestic violence in the hands of her ex-husband Noel Satchell, whom she had married at the age of eighteen. Rowetta, who had two children with her ex-husband, fled the marriage in 1987 to hide in a refuge home, and the couple later divorced. Rowetta has since become a spokesperson for domestic violence awareness, and in 2005 featured in the BBC documentary Battered and Bruised. She also fronted the 2010 World Cup "End The Fear" campaign for Greater Manchester Police.

Filmography

References

External links

Rowetta's official website

1966 births
Living people
20th-century Black British women singers
Singers from Manchester
Happy Mondays members
People educated at Bury Grammar School (Girls)
The X Factor (British TV series) contestants
21st-century Black British women singers
Peter Hook and The Light members